Christina R. Wodtke (born October 22, 1966) is an American businessperson and specialist in the area of design thinking, information architecture and Management Science (specializing in OKR and team productivity.) She is currently a lecturer in HCI at Stanford University.

Career
Wodtke has held a series of executive roles in the tech industry, most notably leading teams who built the events platform and created an algorithm for Linkedin's newsfeed, leading a redesign of Myspace and its profile pages and leading the design and launch of the Zynga.com gaming platform.

Wodtke is a co-founder and past president of the Information Architecture Institute. As a User Experience professional, she has worked for such companies as Yahoo, Hot Studio, The New York Times, and Zynga to improve and develop their Web sites.

Wodtke founded Webby-nominated magazine of design thinking [Boxes and Arrows] and has been published continuously (as well as sometime contributor). Boxes and Arrows was the first online magazine aimed exclusively at working practitioner designers, and has inspired a host of other online 'zines, from UXmatters to Johnny Holland.

She is frequently sought out as an expert for interviews and talks on social web design, gamification, user experience, start-up management, and innovation.

Bibliography

References

External links
Talks
Official site

1966 births
Living people
American bloggers
Information architects
Place of birth missing (living people)
20th-century American businesspeople

Women in technology